The First Ayers Ministry was the 10th Ministry of the Government of South Australia, led by Henry Ayers. It commenced on 15 July 1863, when Ayers won support to form a ministry after the collapse of the First Dutton Ministry. In July 1864, the ministry was defeated on a motion of no confidence, but his opponents were unable to form government, and Ayers was sworn in heading the reconstituted Second Ayers Ministry on 22 July 1864.

References

Ayers 1